Kisubi Mapeera Secondary School is a secondary school in Kampala, Uganda. The school gets its name from a tent peg which the missionary,  Père Simon Lourdel M.Afr. (known as Fr. Mapera) turned into a tree. "Mapeera" is the Baganda rendition of "Mon Pere". 

The school was founded in 1999 as a Catholic private school, owned by the Kampala Archdiocese. From the original three teachers and eight students the school has grown in size top become a community with over 1,000 students with its current headmaster known as Damulira Joseph. The school is located along Entebbe road Kawuku stage and it is a mixed school both O' level and A' level.

References

Secondary schools in Uganda
Schools in Kampala
Educational institutions established in 1999
1999 establishments in Uganda]]